Richard Reimer Meents (August 27, 1875 – July 18, 1945) was an American politician and businessman.

Biography
Meents was born in Ashkum, Illinois. He went to the public schools and to a seminary in Onarga, Illinois. Meents was involved in the banking business. Meents served on the school board and was the secretary of the school board. He was involved with the Republican Party. Meents served in the Illinois House of Representatives from 1915 to 1921 and in the Illinois Senate from 1921 to 1933. Meents died from a heart attack at his home in Ashkum, Illinois.

References

External links

1875 births
1945 deaths
People from Iroquois County, Illinois
Businesspeople from Illinois
School board members in Illinois
Republican Party members of the Illinois House of Representatives
Republican Party Illinois state senators